Beteşti or Beţeşti may refer to several villages in Romania:

 Beteşti, a village in the town of Cristuru Secuiesc, Harghita County
 Beţeşti, a village in Rediu, Neamț